Jacob Rice may refer to:
 Jacob Rice (New Hampshire politician)
 Jacob Rice (New York politician)